Grevillea prostrata, commonly known as the Pallarup grevillea,<ref name=FB>{{FloraBase|name=Grevillea prostrata|id=2074}}</ref> is a species of flowering plant in the family Proteaceae and is endemic to a small area in the southwest of Western Australia. It is a prostrate shrub with more or less pinnatisect leaves and pink and white flowers with a white style.

TaxonomyGrevillea prostrata was first formally described in 1963 by Charles Gardner and Alex George in the Journal of the Royal Society of Western Australia from specimens collected by George near Pallarup Rocks, south-east of Lake King in 1960. The specific epithet (prostrata) means "lying on the ground". 

Distribution and habitat
Pallarup grevillea grows in heath and shrubland on sandplains between Pingrup, Hyden and Lake King in the Coolgardie, Esperance Plains and Mallee bioregions of south-western Western Australia.

Conservation statusGrevillea prostrata'' is listed as "Priority Four" by the Government of Western Australia Department of Biodiversity, Conservation and Attractions, meaning that it is rare or near threatened.

See also
 List of Grevillea species

References

prostrata
Proteales of Australia
Eudicots of Western Australia
Plants described in 1963
Taxa named by Alex George
Taxa named by Charles Gardner